Connecticut's 5th congressional district is a congressional district in the U.S. state of Connecticut. Located in the western part of the state and spanning across parts of Fairfield, Litchfield, New Haven, and Hartford Counties, the district runs from Meriden and New Britain in central Connecticut, westward to Danbury and the surrounding Housatonic Valley, encompassing the Farmington Valley, Upper Naugatuck River Valley, and the Litchfield Hills. The district also includes most of Waterbury.

The district is currently represented by Democrat Jahana Hayes. With a Cook Partisan Voting Index rating of D+3, it is one of the least Democratic districts in Connecticut, a state with an all-Democratic congressional delegation.

History
Historically Republican, the 5th congressional district has been trending Democratic since 2004.  John Kerry carried the district with 49.3% of the vote, a margin of 1,112 votes in the 2004 presidential election.  Barack Obama carried the district in 2008 with 56.3% of the vote and in 2012 with 53.5% of the vote.

The current 5th congressional district was created in 2002 due to reapportionment following the 2000 U.S. Census.  Due to slow population growth, Connecticut lost a seat and the old Waterbury-based 5th district was merged with the New Britain-based 6th district. However, the merged district contained more of the old 6th's territory.

From 1964 to 1990 the 5th congressional district included many towns in Fairfield County which are now located in the 4th congressional district, such as Wilton, Monroe, Ridgefield, and Shelton. It also included the lower Naugatuck River Valley towns of Ansonia, Derby, Seymour, and Naugatuck which are now in the 3rd congressional district.

In the early 20th century the 5th congressional district included Waterbury, Litchfield County, and the Naugatuck Valley. It did not include any portion of Fairfield or Hartford counties and did not include the City of Meriden.

Towns in the district
The district includes the following towns:

Fairfield County – Bethel, Brookfield, Danbury, New Fairfield, Newtown, and Sherman.

Hartford County – Avon, Burlington, Canton, Farmington, New Britain, Plainville, and Simsbury.

Litchfield County – Bethlehem, Bridgewater, Canaan, Cornwall, Goshen, Harwinton, Kent, Litchfield, Morris, New Milford, Norfolk, North Canaan, Plymouth, Roxbury, Salisbury, Sharon, Thomaston, Torrington (part), Warren, Washington, Watertown, and Woodbury.

New Haven County – Cheshire, Meriden, Middlebury, Southbury, Waterbury (part), and Wolcott.

Voter registration

Recent presidential elections

Recent elections

List of members representing the district 

District organized from Connecticut's at-large congressional district in 1837.

Historical district boundaries

See also

Connecticut's congressional districts
List of United States congressional districts

References

Further reading

 Congressional Biographical Directory of the United States 1774–present

5
Litchfield County, Connecticut
Fairfield County, Connecticut
New Haven County, Connecticut
Hartford County, Connecticut
Political history of Connecticut
Constituencies established in 1837
1837 establishments in Connecticut
Constituencies disestablished in 1843
1843 disestablishments in Connecticut
Constituencies established in 1913
1913 establishments in Connecticut